Hilton is a village and civil parish in the borough of Stockton-on-Tees and the ceremonial county of North Yorkshire, England.  It is a small village with an estimated population of around 400, measured at 374 in the 2011 census. Despite its proximity to Teesside, the village retains its rural feel, and has a number of public footpaths surrounding it.

The village church, the Church of St Peter, Hilton, which is largely unaltered since its building in the 12th century. The old Hilton Manor House was demolished in the 1960s and the site is now occupied by a number of houses along Manor Drive. Until the 1960s the village consisted of only around a dozen properties plus a few farms, but several small-scale housing developments in the 1970s and 1990s have seen the size of the village increase dramatically.  The village has no shop, but has retained its pub, The Falcon (formerly The Fox & Hounds). At the turn of the Millennium, Hilton's village hall was refurbished and extended.

References

External links

Villages in North Yorkshire
Civil parishes in North Yorkshire
Borough of Stockton-on-Tees
Places in the Tees Valley